Lanier University, named after "poet of the Confederacy" Sidney Lanier, was a short-lived university in today's Morningside-Lenox Park neighborhood of Atlanta, Georgia. It was notable for its connections with the second Ku Klux Klan, which was also based in Atlanta and which owned the university for a time.

Charles Lewis Fowler, a Baptist minister, founded Lanier in 1917. He hoped for financing from Coca-Cola magnate Asa Candler but instead got backing from the Georgia Baptist Association. Lanier was to be Georgia's first co-ed Baptist college.

Architect A. Ten Eyck Brown made architectural plans for the new campus in Morningside on a crescent-shaped strip of land (see illustration). At the head of this strip, at University Drive and Spring Valley Lane, would stand a replica of the Custis-Lee Mansion in Arlington, Virginia. This was built and named Arlington Hall. The University Park subdivision was developed around the university in 1921, and University Drive is also a reminder of that time.

Among its faculty was William Joseph Simmons, founder and leader of the second Ku Klux Klan. Simmons was a "professor of southern history" at Lanier.

Financial problems plagued the school; in 1921, the school was sold to the Ku Klux Klan, which owned it for a year, with Nathan Bedford Forrest II (grandson of the Confederate general by the same name) as secretary and business manager. "The central idea involved in this proposition of the operation of Lanier University by the Knights of the Ku Klux Klan is to do what few universities are doing in this country, and that Is to teach pure Americanism," Forrest told The New York Times. "Most of our large universities now are turning out Socialists, cynics and atheists."

Forrest predicted the Klan-run Lanier would enroll 1,000 to 2,000 students within a year. Instead, it failed in less time than that, closing on September 1, 1922. It was sold that October.

The property became a synagogue. In 1949 Congregation Shearith Israel, then in Summerhill, bought the property from the estate of Walter E. King. During this time Summerhill was deteriorating due to the construction of the Downtown Connector freeway, and many Jews were moving from there to Morningside, where many would later join to fight the construction of the I-485 freeway through Morningside.

Since 2009, Arlington Hall has been occupied by the Canterbury School, while the synagogue remains in buildings behind it to the east.

References

External links
 "Shearith Israel Renovates.....'All Southern' Lanier University ", Morningside/Lenox Park Association
 "Forrest tells aims of Ku Klux College", New York Times, September 12, 1921
 The Ku-Klux Klan: Hearings before the Committee on rules - information on faculty, curriculum, etc. after KKK acquisition of Lanier

1917 establishments in Georgia (U.S. state)
1920s disestablishments in Georgia (U.S. state)
A. Ten Eyck Brown buildings
Defunct private universities and colleges in Georgia (U.S. state)
Educational institutions disestablished in 1922
Educational institutions established in 1917
History of Atlanta
Jews and Judaism in Atlanta
Ku Klux Klan in Georgia (U.S. state)
Synagogues in Georgia (U.S. state)
Universities and colleges in Atlanta
White supremacy in the United States